Margarita Maslennikova (2 November 1928 – 5 March 2021) was a Soviet cross-country skier who competed in the 1950s. She was born in Leningrad. She won a gold medal in the 3 × 5 km relay at the 1954 FIS Nordic World Ski Championships in Falun and finished fourth in the 10 km event at those same championships. She died in Saint Petersburg, aged 92.

Cross-country skiing results
All results are sourced from the International Ski Federation (FIS).

World Championships
 1 medal – (1 gold)

References

External links

Soviet female cross-country skiers
2021 deaths
FIS Nordic World Ski Championships medalists in cross-country skiing
1928 births